Tunisia competed at the 2010 Summer Youth Olympics, the inaugural Youth Olympic Games, held in Singapore from 14 August to 26 August 2010.

Medalists

The medal was won as Mixed NOCs therefore the medal doesn't count towards the overall count for Tunisia.

Athletics

Boys
Track and Road Events

Girls
Track and Road Events

Field Events

Canoeing

Girls

Rowing

Sailing

One Person Dinghy

Swimming

 * Qualified due to the withdrawal of another swimmer

Table tennis 

Individual

Team

Taekwondo

Tennis

Singles

Doubles

Weightlifting

Wrestling

Freestyle

References

External links
Competitors List: Tunisia – Singapore 2010 official site

2010 in Tunisian sport
Nations at the 2010 Summer Youth Olympics
Tunisia at the Youth Olympics